Everett Clarence Dade is a mathematician at University of Illinois at Urbana–Champaign working on finite groups and representation theory, who introduced the Dade isometry and Dade's conjecture. While an undergraduate at Harvard University, he became a Putnam Fellow twice, in 1955 and 1957.

Work
The Dade isometry is an isometry from  class functions on a subgroup H with support on a subset K of H to class functions on a group G .

Dade's conjecture is a conjecture relating the numbers of characters of blocks of a finite group to the numbers of characters of blocks of local subgroups.

References
Sources
 

Citations

External links
Everett C. Dade

20th-century American mathematicians
21st-century American mathematicians
Living people
Year of birth missing (living people)
Group theorists
Princeton University alumni
University of Illinois Urbana-Champaign faculty
Putnam Fellows
Harvard College alumni